Port Silt Loam is the state soil of Oklahoma. This type of soil is reddish in color due to the weathering of reddish sandstones, siltstones, and shales of the Permian period.  

It is a medium-textured alluvial soil deposited along flood plains. Port Silt Loam can be found in 33 of the 77 counties in Oklahoma and covers around one million acres (4,000 km²). The name comes from the small community of Port, in Washita County, and the texture of the top soil (silt loam).

See also
Pedology (soil study)
List of U.S. state soils
Soil types

External links

 Official Series Description - Port Series
 Port Silt Loam Brouchure (published by the Oklahoma Conservation Commission)
 Port - Oklahoma State Soil (pdf) 

Pedology
Soil in the United States
Geology of Oklahoma
Symbols of Oklahoma
Great Plains
Types of soil